Predrag Krunić (born 27 November 1967) is a Bosnia and Herzegovina professional basketball coach. He currently coaches the Kagoshima Rebnise of the B.League 

Before he returned to Bonn in 2016, he coached professional teams in Germany and Poland.

References

External links
Eurobasket.com Profile
FIBA Europe Cup Profile

1967 births
Living people
Bosnia and Herzegovina basketball coaches
Bosnia and Herzegovina expatriate basketball people in Serbia
Kagoshima Rebnise coaches
KK Zemun coaches
Telekom Baskets Bonn coaches
BC Avtodor coaches
Mitteldeutscher BC coaches
Medi Bayreuth coaches
KK Włocławek coaches
Baskets Oldenburg coaches